
Aurantia may refer to:

Animals
Argiope aurantia, the black and yellow garden spider
Partula aurantia, a tree snail
Pseudoeurycea aurantia, a Mexican salamander
Golden masked owl (Tyto aurantia), a barn owl of New Britain, Papua New Guinea

Fungi
Aleuria aurantia, the orange peel fungus
Tremella aurantia, the golden ear fungus

Plants
Banksia aurantia, a Western Australian shrub

Places
Aurantia, Florida

Other
Frateuria aurantia, a bacterium
Aurantia, an energy firm launched by GreenFuel Technologies Corporation
Ammonium salt of Hexanitrodiphenylamine, used as a yellow colorant for leather, wool and silk